Jaunawas (or Jonawas  is a village in Rewari district, Haryana India. It is about 9.7 km from Rewari town on the Rewari-Delhi Road near Hansaka.

Demographics of 2011
As of 2011 India census, Jaunawas, Rewari had a population of 1956 in 398 households. Males (1024) constitute 52.35%  of the population and females (932) 47.64%. Jaunawas has an average literacy (1482) rate of 75.76%, higher than the national average of 74%: male literacy (862) is 58.16%, and female literacy (620) is 41.83% of total literates (1482). In Jaunawas, Rewari, 12.37% of the population is under 6 years of age (245).

Adjacent villages
Nikhri Village on NH48 (Old NH08)
Hansaka on Rewari-Delhi road
Masani on Rewari-Delhi road
Dungarwas on Rewari-Delhi road
Baliar Khurd (Rewari)
Baliar Kalan
Mundia Khera
Khijuri
Rasgan

See also
Joniawas (on the Rewari-Delhi road on Jaipur Highway)

References 

Villages in Rewari district